Bryant and May Factory may refer to:

 Bryant and May Factory, Bow
 Bryant and May Factory, Melbourne

See also
Bryant and May